Auntie or aunty is an informal form of the word aunt. They may also refer to:


Broadcasting
 Aunty, an informal name for the Australian Broadcasting Corporation
 Auntie, an informal name for the British Broadcasting Corporation 
"Auntie" (song),  a song released in 1972 to celebrate the BBC's 50th year

Films
Auntie, a 1914 film based on a novel by Temple Bailey
 Aunty (film), a 1995 Telugu language film

Other uses
 Aunty, a term sometimes used to address an Australian Aboriginal elder

See also

 Uncle (disambiguation)